Threadbanger is an American YouTube channel run by Rob Czar and Corinne Leigh producing primarily DIY and crafting content. The channel is known for such series as Man vs. Pin, Corinne vs. Pin, Man vs. House, and the YouTube Red series Do or DIY.

History 

Threadbanger launched in 2008. The channel began with content centred around sewing but later shifted to focus on broader DIY series such as Man vs. Pin and Corinne vs. Pin. Threadbanger reached one million subscribers in 2015.

Threadbanger began posting videos as part of the Man vs. House series in late 2017. The series followed Czar and Leigh refurbishing and renovating an older house. Man vs. House was sponsored by Lowe's. In May 2018, Threadbanger launched the YouTube Red series Do or DIY.

In 2019, Czar was declared medically deceased after suffering a heart attack. He was revived and subsequently diagnosed with the autoimmune disease, granulomatosis with polyangiitis. Czar's health issues caused the Threadbanger to take a break from posting videos. Threadbanger returned to posting videos on August 3, 2019 with the video "I DIED....but", which recounted Czar's health issues for the YouTube audience. As of October 2019, Threadbanger had 4 million subscribers.

After recovering, Czar began working seriously on his painting, partly chronicling his art-making on ThreadBanger. In 2022, Czar and Leigh opened an art gallery called the Czart Gallery in West Asheville to display Czar's art.

Awards 
Czar and Leigh were honorees during the 2009 Webby awards for the How-To, Explainer & DIY category. Along with being the nominees during the 2008, 2009, and 2015 Webbys. During the 2017 Webbys, Threadbanger won the People's Voice category for best web personality.

References 

English-language YouTube channels
YouTube channels launched in 2008
DIY YouTubers
American YouTubers
Webby Award winners